Seyyed Abdollah (also Romanized as Seyyed ‘Abdollāh) is a village in Shavur Rural District, Shavur District, Shush County, Khuzestan Province, Iran. At the 2006 census, its population was 637, in 106 families.

References 

Populated places in Shush County